In computing, the motherboard form factor is the specification of a motherboard – the dimensions, power supply type, location of mounting holes, number of ports on the back panel, etc. Specifically, in the IBM PC compatible industry, standard form factors ensure that parts are interchangeable across competing vendors and generations of technology, while in enterprise computing, form factors ensure that server modules fit into existing rackmount systems. Traditionally, the most significant specification is for that of the motherboard, which generally dictates the overall size of the case. Small form factors have been developed and implemented.

Overview of form factors 

A PC motherboard is the main circuit board within a typical desktop computer, laptop or server. Its main functions are as follows:
 To serve as a central backbone to which all other modular parts such as CPU, RAM, and hard drives can be attached as required to create a computer
 To be interchangeable (in most cases) with different components (in particular CPU and expansion cards) for the purposes of customization and upgrading
 To distribute power to other circuit boards
 To electronically co-ordinate and interface the operation of the components
As new generations of components have been developed, the standards of motherboards have changed too. For example, the introduction of AGP and, more recently, PCI Express have influenced motherboard design. However, the standardized size and layout of motherboards have changed much more slowly and are controlled by their own standards. The list of components required on a motherboard changes far more slowly than the components themselves. For example, north bridge microchips have changed many times since their introduction with many manufacturers bringing out their own versions, but in terms of form factor standards, provisions for north bridges have remained fairly static for many years.

Although it is a slower process, form factors do evolve regularly in response to changing demands. IBM's long-standing standard, AT (Advanced Technology), was superseded in 1995 by the current industry standard ATX (Advanced Technology Extended), which still governs the size and design of the motherboard in most modern PCs. The latest update to the ATX standard was released in 2007. A divergent standard by chipset manufacturer VIA called EPIA (also known as ITX, and not to be confused with EPIC) is based upon smaller form factors and its own standards.

Differences between form factors are most apparent in terms of their intended market sector, and involve variations in size, design compromises and typical features. Most modern computers have very similar requirements, so form factor differences tend to be based upon subsets and supersets of these. For example, a desktop computer may require more sockets for maximum flexibility and many optional connectors and other features on board, whereas a computer to be used in a multimedia system may need to be optimized for heat and size, with additional plug-in cards being less common. The smallest motherboards may sacrifice CPU flexibility in favor of a fixed manufacturer's choice.

Comparisons

Tabular information

Size variants
List is incomplete

Maximum number of expansion card slots
ATX case compatible:

Visual examples of different form factors

PC/104 and EBX 
PC/104 is an embedded computer standard which defines both a form factor and computer bus. PC/104 is intended for embedded computing environments. Single-board computers built to this form factor are often sold by COTS vendors, which benefits users who want a customized rugged system, without months of design and paper work.

The PC/104 form factor was standardized by the PC/104 Consortium in 1992. An IEEE standard corresponding to PC/104 was drafted as IEEE P996.1, but never ratified.

The 5.75 × 8.0 in Embedded Board eXpandable (EBX) specification, which was derived from Ampro's proprietary Little Board form-factor, resulted from a collaboration between Ampro and Motorola Computer Group.

As compared with PC/104 modules, these larger (but still reasonably embeddable) SBCs tend to have everything of a full PC on them, including application oriented interfaces like audio, analog, or digital I/O in many cases. Also it's much easier to fit Pentium CPUs, whereas it's a tight squeeze (or expensive) to do so on a PC/104 SBC. Typically, EBX SBCs contain: the CPU; upgradeable RAM subassemblies (e.g., DIMM); Flash memory for solid state drive; multiple USB, serial, and parallel ports; onboard expansion via a PC/104 module stack; off-board expansion via ISA and/or PCI buses (from the PC/104 connectors); networking interface (typically Ethernet); and video (typically CRT, LCD, and TV).

Mini PC 
Mini PC is a PC small form factor very close in size to an external CD or DVD drive. Mini PCs have proven popular for use as HTPCs.

Examples 
 AOpen XC mini
 Apple Mac mini
 Intel NUC
 Gigabyte Brix
 Zotac ZBOX
 Asus Vivopc
 Lenovo ThinkCentre Tiny
 Dell Optiplex Mini/Micro
 Acer Veriton

See also 
 Hard-disk-drive form factors
 Small form factor
 PICOe

Notes

References

External links 
 The official Intel Form factors website containing form factor descriptions

Computing comparisons